Aldens may refer to:
Aldens (department store), American mail order company 
Alden Shoe Company, American shoe manufacturer